The Weatherby Orion is a Boxlock Over-Under Double Barrel Shotgun with a solid steel receiver.

References

Double-barreled shotguns of the United States